Dmytro Antonovych (14 November 1877, in Kyiv – 12 October 1945, in Prague) was a Ukrainian politician and art historian.

Family
Professor Dmytro Antonovych was the son of two Ukrainian historians: his father was Volodymyr Antonovych and his mother was Kateryna Antonovych-Melnyk (1859–1942), an archaeologist from the city of Khorol (today – Poltava Oblast). He married the artist and art historian Kateryna Antonovych, and was the father of Marko Antonovych and Mykhailo Antonovych.

Career
In 1900–1905, he was one of the founders and leaders of the Revolutionary Ukrainian Party (RUP), established in 1900 in the city of Kharkiv, and from 1905, of the Ukrainian Social Democratic Workers' Party (USDRP).

Antonovych was a member of the Ukrainian Central Council, and he served as the minister of naval affairs of the Ukrainian People's Republic, in cabinets headed by Volodymyr Vynnychenko and Vsevolod Holubovych (1917-1918), and the minister of arts in Volodymyr Chekhivsky’s government (1918/1919). Then Antonovych was the president of the Ukrainian diplomatic mission of the UNR in Rome.

References

External links
 Antonovych, Dmytro in the Encyclopedia of Ukraine, vol. 1 (1984).

1877 births
1945 deaths
Politicians from Kyiv
People from Kievsky Uyezd
Ukrainian people of Polish descent
Revolutionary Ukrainian Party politicians
Ukrainian Social Democratic Labour Party politicians
Russian Constituent Assembly members
Members of the Central Council of Ukraine
Diplomats from Kyiv
Ukrainian art historians
National University of Kharkiv alumni